Michael Berrer became the first champion of this tournament. He defeated Jarkko Nieminen 6–7(4), 6–4, 6–4 in the final match.

Seeds

Draw

Finals

Top half

Bottom half

References
 Main Draw
 Qualifying Draw

ATP Salzburg Indoors - Singles
ATP Salzburg Indoors